Stephan Jäger (born 30 May 1989), also spelled as Stephan Jaeger, is a German professional golfer who plays on the PGA Tour. He has won six tournaments on the second tier Korn Ferry Tour in the United States.

Amateur career
Jäger played collegiate golf at University of Tennessee-Chattanooga. He turned professional in 2012.

Professional career
Jäger qualified for the 2015 U.S. Open where he shot 74–80 to miss the cut.

At the 2016 Ellie Mae Classic, Jäger shot a 12-under par 58 in the first round and followed it up with rounds of 65-64-63 to claim his first Web.com Tour victory. He set the 72-hole aggregate record with his 250 and tied the to-par record, at 30 under par, and won by 7 strokes over Rhein Gibson. He also set the 36-hole and 54-hole records. Despite the win, Jäger finished 28th on the regular season money list, three spots short of a guaranteed PGA Tour card.

In 2017, Jäger won twice on the Web.com Tour, finishing fifth on the regular-season money list and earning a PGA Tour card for the 2017–18 season. In May 2018, ranked 161st in the FedEx Cup and having failed to qualify for The Players Championship, Jäger played in and won the Web.com Tour's Knoxville Open, his fourth victory on that tour. After failing to finish in either the top 125 of the FedEx Cup or the Web.com Tour's top 25, Jäger regained his PGA Tour card through the Web.com Tour Finals.

Back on the Korn Ferry Tour in 2020, Jäger picked up his fifth title on the tour at the Albertsons Boise Open. The win helped gain him exemption into the 2020 U.S. Open as one of the leading points scorers in the final three Championship Series events, and into four alternate events on the PGA Tour in 2021 by virtue of being in the top ten of the tour standings after the Korn Ferry Tour Championship. He won the Korn Ferry Tour Player of the Year award for the 2020–21 season.

During the current 2021–22 PGA Tour season, Jäger has finished in the top 10 twice: T6 at the Wells Fargo Championship, and solo 5th at the Rocket Mortgage Classic.

Professional wins (6)

Korn Ferry Tour wins (6)

*Note: The 2017 BMW Charity Pro-Am was shortened to 54 holes due to rain.

Korn Ferry Tour playoff record (1–1)

Results in major championships
Results not in chronological order in 2020.

CUT = missed the half-way cut
"T" = tied for place
NT = No tournament due to COVID-19 pandemic

Results in The Players Championship

CUT = missed the halfway cut
"T" indicates a tie for a place

Team appearances
Amateur
European Boys' Team Championship (representing Germany): 2006
European Amateur Team Championship (representing Germany): 2011

Professional
World Cup (representing Germany): 2016

See also
2017 Web.com Tour Finals graduates
2018 Web.com Tour Finals graduates
2021 Korn Ferry Tour Finals graduates
List of golfers with most Korn Ferry Tour wins
Lowest rounds of golf

References

External links

German male golfers
PGA Tour golfers
Korn Ferry Tour graduates
University of Tennessee at Chattanooga alumni
Sportspeople from Munich
1989 births
Living people